Rankin/Bass Productions was an American production company, known for its seasonal television specials.

Television specials

Feature films

Animated TV series
With the exception of "The New Adventures of Pinocchio" (stop-motion), all of the TV shows were traditionally animated.

Live-action productions

Explanatory notes

References 

Lists of films by studio